Coaticook is a regional county municipality in the Estrie region of Quebec, Canada. The seat is Coaticook.

History
On September 3, 1783, as a result of the signing of the Treaty of Paris the American Revolutionary War ended with Great Britain. Quebec's border with the states of Vermont and New Hampshire was established at 45 degrees north latitude.

Subdivisions
There are 12 subdivisions within the RCM:

Cities & Towns (2)
 Coaticook
 Waterville

Municipalities (9)
 Barnston-Ouest
 Compton
 Dixville
 East Hereford
 Martinville
 Saint-Herménégilde
 Saint-Malo
 Saint-Venant-de-Paquette
 Stanstead-Est

Townships (1)
 Sainte-Edwidge-de-Clifton

Demographics
Mother tongue data from Canada 2016 Census

Transportation

Access Routes
Highways and numbered routes that run through the municipality, including external routes that start or finish at the county border:

 Autoroutes
 

 Principal Highways
 
 
 

 Secondary Highways
 
 
 
 

 External Routes

See also
 List of regional county municipalities and equivalent territories in Quebec

References

External links
 Coaticook Regional County Municipality website 

Coaticook Regional County Municipality